Tomka gas test site was a secret chemical weapons testing facility near a place codenamed Volsk-18 (Wolsk, in German literature), 20 km off Volsk, now Shikhany, Saratov Oblast, Russia created within the framework of German-Soviet military cooperation to circumvent the demilitarization provisions of the post-World War I Treaty of Versailles. It operated (according to an agreement undersigned by fictitious joint stock companies) during 1926-1933.

After 1933 the area was used by the Red Army and expanded under the name "Volsk-18" or "Schichany-2" to Russia's most important center for the development of chemical warfare agents and protective measures against NBC weapons.

Another chemical site was established by the settlement of Ukhtomsky, Moscow Region.

See also
Kama tank school
Lipetsk fighter-pilot school

References

Reichswehr
Military history of the Soviet Union
Military history of Germany
1926 establishments in the Soviet Union
Secret military programs
Germany–Soviet Union relations
Military education and training in the Soviet Union
Chemical warfare facilities
Soviet chemical weapons program